Simone Prutsch (born 17 October 1978) is an Austrian badminton player. She competed for Austria at the 2012 Summer Olympics.

Achievements

BWF International Challenge/Series

Women's singles

Women’s doubles

References

External links
 

1978 births
Living people
Austrian female badminton players
Olympic badminton players of Austria
Badminton players at the 2012 Summer Olympics